Nicolas Barat was a French Catholic scholar of Hebrew works, who died in 1706.

Life
He was born at Bourges during the first quarter of the seventeenth century;  He began his studies at Sens, and continued them in Paris, where he was instructor in the Mazarin College. There he came under the influence of Richard Simon, the Orientalist and Biblical scholar. 

He died in 1706 at Paris.

Works
Most of his published work was done in collaboration with other scholars. With Charles Bordes he edited the posthumous work of Louis Thomassin, Glossarium universale hebraicum (Paris, 1697), and aided Jean-Baptiste Duhamel in the publication of his Bible (Paris, 1706). At the time of his death he was engaged on a French translation of Schabtai's Rabbinical Library. His critical opinions, and much information that he had acquired, were published posthumously under the title, Nouvelle bibliothèque choisie (Amsterdam, 1714, 2 vols.)

References

Attribution

French scholars
Year of birth missing
1706 deaths